Domingo Omar Zalazar (born 10 August 1986) is an Argentine professional footballer who currently plays for club Atlético Alvarado as striker.

External links
 Domingo Zalazar at Football-Lineups
 
 

1986 births
Living people
Argentine footballers
Argentine expatriate footballers
Defensa y Justicia footballers
El Porvenir footballers
Olimpo footballers
Audax Italiano footballers
Expatriate footballers in Chile
Association football forwards
Sportspeople from Santa Fe Province